Sarah Louisa Yates Robison (May 27, 1866 – March 30, 1946) was the seventh Relief Society General President of the Church of Jesus Christ of Latter-day Saints (LDS Church) from 1928 to 1939.

Early life
Sarah Louisa "Louise" Yates was born to Thomas and Elizabeth Yates and was raised in Scipio, Utah Territory. Her parents had been asked to colonize Round Valley in Millard County, Utah. She was the second-oldest of their five children. Robison attended Brigham Young Academy for a year at the age of 14 and then took classes in dressmaking. She married Joseph L. Robison on October 11, 1883, at age 17 and became the mother of six children. Although she only had limited schooling, once her children were grown, Robison took classes from a university and would wake up at 4 am to study in the mornings. As a young mother, Robison was diagnosed with facial cancer, but her face healed without her having to undergo surgery.

Church service
Robison served on the Relief Society General Board, where she directed the Temple and Burial Clothing Department. Before becoming president of the Relief Society in 1928, Robison served as the second counselor to her predecessor, Clarissa S. Williams. Robison was president of the organization during the Great Depression. Robison felt inadequate for the position of president due to her lack of education, but was able to identify with struggling sisters during the time period in which she served.

Robison was the first Relief Society president to give an address at a General Conference of The Church of Jesus Christ of Latter-day Saints in October 1929.She was also the first president who was able to travel overseas to visit the Relief Society organizations in Great Britain. In 1933 she was a delegate to the World Congress of the International Council of Women in Paris. That same year she was instrumental in the building of a monument to commemorate the Relief Society in Nauvoo, Illinois, although this monument was later relocated.

While serving, the church established their welfare program to help needy members in 1936. In 1937, Robison founded Mormon Handicraft, a non-profit organization that sold discounted clothing and blankets made by members of the Relief Society. (When the church announced plans to close the Mormon Handicraft store in 1986, it was purchased by Deseret Book.) During Robison's tenure, blue and gold were adopted as the official colors of the Relief Society. She was released from her position as the Relief Society president in 1939. In 1940, Robison was succeeded by her first counselor, Amy B. Lyman. She died in San Francisco and her funeral was held in the Salt Lake Assembly Hall.

Publications

Articles

References

External links
Nola Redd, "Relief Society Presidents: Louise Y. Robison", families.com blog
"Louise Yates Robison", ldswomenofgod.com

1866 births
1946 deaths
American leaders of the Church of Jesus Christ of Latter-day Saints
Counselors in the General Presidency of the Relief Society
General Presidents of the Relief Society
Brigham Young Academy alumni
People from Millard County, Utah
Latter Day Saints from Utah